Annika Eva Ingegerd Kjærgaard (originally Johansson) (born 18 May 1971) is a Swedish singer and former member of the Swedish pop group, Alcazar.

Career 
Kjærgaard was born in Hässleholm, Sweden. Mostly known as Annikafiore in Alcazar, she quit the group in 2007, leaving a spot open for Lina Hedlund. Magnus Carlsson also left during that time. However Therese Merkel and Andreas Lundstedt stayed and continued with the Alcazar project.

In 2009, Annikafiore formed a new group called Avatar versus Eve (A.v. E). Their first single "Party People" came with six different versions, including a remix by the internationally known SoundFactory.

Personal life 
In September 2004 Annika married her Danish boyfriend Jeppe Kjærgaard and they are currently residing in Höllviken. The couple has a son born in December 2007.

Discography
Alcazar albums
1999–2002: Casino – Released in: Sweden, UK, Taiwan, Japan, Australia, USA & Europa.
2003–2004: Alcazarized – Released in: Sweden, Germany, Asia, South Korea, Japan, and Taiwan.
2004: Dancefloor Deluxe [2CD] – Released in: Sweden & Finland
2005: Dancefloor Deluxe – Released in: Sweden & Germany & Tyskland

Alcazar singles
2005: Start the Fire
2005: Alcastar
2004: Here I Am
2004: Physical
2004: This is the World We Live in
2003: Love Life
2003: Someday
2003: Ménage à trois
2003: Not a Sinner nor a Saint
2002: Don't You Want Me
2001: Sexual Guarantee
2001: Crying at the Discothèque
2000: Ritmo del Amor
1999: Shine On

A.v. E singles
2009: Party People
2009: I'm On Fire (feat. Sophie Rimheden)

Annikafiore singles
2010: Forbidden Love (Official Copenhagen Pride 2010 song)
2011: Don't Wanna C U 2nite No. 16 Swedish Dance Charts

External links
Glamourfiore.tripod.com
A.v.E Online

References

1971 births
Living people
Swedish women singers
Alcazar (band) members
People from Hässleholm Municipality
English-language singers from Sweden
Melodifestivalen contestants of 2005
Melodifestivalen contestants of 2003